Lawrence Municipal Airport may refer to:

 Lawrence Municipal Airport (Kansas) in Lawrence, Kansas, United States (FAA/IATA: LWC)
 Lawrence Municipal Airport (Massachusetts) in Lawrence, Massachusetts, United States (FAA/IATA: LWM)

See also 
 Lawrence Airport (disambiguation)
 Lawrence County Airport (disambiguation)